Cleveland Metroparks is an extensive system of nature preserves in Greater Cleveland, Ohio. Eighteen reservations, which largely encircle the city of Cleveland, follow along the shore of Lake Erie and the rivers and creeks that flow through the region. In addition, the district includes the zoo in Cleveland. Four of the reservations are adjacent to Cuyahoga Valley National Park.

Although the majority of the reservations are in suburban Cuyahoga County, Brookside Reservation is located within the city of Cleveland, and the Lakefront Reservation consists of several beachfront parks spanning the city's waterfront. Additionally, three of the reservations are either partially or entirely situated outside Cuyahoga County: a portion of North Chagrin Reservation is in Lake County; a small portion of Bradley Woods Reservation is in Lorain County; the Hinckley Reservation is in Hinckley Township in Medina County.

The North Chagrin Reservation houses one of the only old growth forests in Northeast Ohio, the A.B. Williams Memorial Woods.

History
The genesis of the Cleveland Metropolitan Park System began with a vision by William Albert Stinchcomb in the early 20th century. A self-taught engineer working as a surveyor for the City of Cleveland in 1895, Stinchcomb was appointed chief engineer of the City Parks Department by Mayor Tom Johnson in 1902, and shortly thereafter began to conceptualize an Emerald Necklace for the city. Stinchcomb lobbied the Ohio legislature to amend the state constitution so as to permit the authorization of natural resource conservation at the county level in 1913. However, the Ohio Supreme Court overturned Cuyahoga County's new park law as unconstitutional. Unflappable in his pursuit, Stinchcomb then went back to Columbus lobbying for new legislation allowing for the establishment of what was to become the Metropolitan Park District, which is today the oldest metropolitan park district in Ohio.

In 1915, Stinchcomb  received the break that would finally allow him to pursue his ambitious goal. While serving as Cuyahoga County engineer, he was approached by city council and offered an appointment as consulting engineer on what was eventually to become the Cleveland Metropolitan Park District board—the same board he'd lobbied for two years prior. Stinchcomb accepted and, at the urging of city council, immediately hired the renowned landscape architectural firm, the Olmsted Brothers. The group immediately went to work drawing up plans for a system of connecting parks as well as the acquisition of land and resources. The proposed Cuyahoga County Park and Boulevard System, which included a parkway encircling the Cleveland area, following various creeks and rivers in the area, was the framework for what would become today's Metroparks system.

Stinchcomb returned to the Statehouse in 1917, this time as an officer of the newly formed Metropolitan Park District board, and proposed a bill that would authorize the Metropolitan Park District board to levy a one-tenth mill tax to fund the district's operations. This was followed shortly after by the authorization of a second on-tenth mill tax to fund property acquisition By 1921, the fledgling Park District had acquired the land that would become the Rocky River and Big Creek Reservations, most of which was donated. Between 1920 and 1930, the system grew through the investment of capital from its tax levies. Purchased for approximately $4 million, land for the Hinckley, Brecksville, Bedford, South Chagrin, North Chagrin and Euclid Creek Reservations increased the district's holdings from just over 100 acres to more than 9,000 within the span of a decade.

The Metroparks today
With free admission and almost unlimited access during daylight hours, the Metroparks' 24,000+ acres are a widely popular destination for runners, hikers, cyclists, boaters, fishermen, and nature enthusiasts. A major source of outdoor recreation in the region, official attendance figures recorded 18.5 million recreational visitors to the system's 18 reservations and the zoo in 2018, making the attraction one of the most visited in the state of Ohio. The Metroparks golf courses, amenities that do exact a fee, attract over 400,000 golfers annually. With varying resources, terrains and geographical features, each park is unique. Some features, such as the toboggan chutes (also ask a fee) at Mill Stream Run Reservation's Chalet, are found nowhere else in the entire State of Ohio.

Safety
The Cleveland Metroparks are patrolled by the Cleveland Metroparks Police Department which was founded in 1917. The departments primary goal is to provide a safe environment for the millions of visitors to the park system. Previously known as "Rangers" (c. 1959-2019), the department returned to its original 1921 title, "Police", in 2019 to better communicate the police function and law enforcement role within the communities served. Members of the department have always been fully certified police officers despite the title changes. Cleveland Metroparks Police patrol the reservations and lands adjacent to, 24 hours a day, 7 days a week, enforcing both traffic, criminal, and wildlife law utilizing several specialized police units including; Motorcycle Unit, K-9 Unit, Mounted Unit, Dive Team, Detective Bureau, Bicycle Unit, Traffic Unit, Warrant Unit, Special Operations, and the Training/ Firearms/ Subject Control teams.

Reservations

Golf Courses

Gallery

See also
 Squire's Castle (North Chagrin Reservation, Willoughby Hills)

References

External links

Cleveland Metroparks site
Cleveland Metroparks Zoo site

1917 establishments in the United States
Landmarks in Ohio
Park districts in Ohio
Protected areas of Cuyahoga County, Ohio
Protected areas of Lake County, Ohio
Protected areas of Lorain County, Ohio
Protected areas of Medina County, Ohio
Regional parks in the United States